The Union and Advertiser, also known as the Daily Union and Advertiser was a newspaper in Rochester, New York. It was published by Curtis, Butts & Co. It was published from 1856 until at least 1886. It was succeeded in 1918 by the Rochester Times-Union. For at least part of its history it was a daily. Several volumes are part of the Library of Congress' collection.

Papers it competed with over the years included the Rochester Democrat and Chronicle.

History
The Rochester Daily Advertiser was published from 1826.

The New York Times reported on the paper's American Civil War era coverage in 1863.

The paper covered the National Convention of Spiritualists in Rochester August 26-28 1868.

Artist Harvey Ellis had a work published in the paper in 1895. It is now held by the Boston Public Library.

In 1908, the Union and Advertiser press was used to publish a publication on the origin and development of Rochester's park system.

March 9, 1911 the paper ran an obituary on William Webster, landscape artist at the Glen Iris Estate,  home to the William Pryor Letchworth's residence that became the Glen Iris Inn and the land that is now part of Letchworth State Park.

References

Newspapers published in Rochester, New York
History of Rochester, New York
Daily newspapers published in New York (state)
Defunct newspapers published in New York (state)
1856 establishments in New York (state)
1886 disestablishments in the United States